The National Transport Museum of Ireland is based in the grounds of  Howth Castle in Ireland.

The museum is located in the Heritage Depot, Howth Demesne, Howth, Ireland (entry is via the main gates for Howth Castle, turning right just before the castle is reached).

Sixty vehicles are currently in Howth on display. The oldest items date from second half of the 19th century, the newest 1984. It features buses, lorries, trucks, fire engines, trams and tractors. Also exhibited is the restored Hill of Howth No.9 Tram.

The museum is run on a voluntary basis, and is funded by a minimal entry fee and donations

References

External links
National Transport Museum of Ireland website

Transport museums in Ireland
History museums in the Republic of Ireland
National museums of the Republic of Ireland
Museums in Fingal
Transport in the Republic of Ireland
1971 establishments in Ireland